Hussain Ahmed may refer to:

 Hussain Ahmed (basketball) (born 1989), Emirati basketball player
 Hussain Ahmed (footballer) (1932–2021), Indian footballer
Hussain Ahmed Madani (1879–1957), Indian Islamic scholar, recipient of Padma Bhushan
Hafiz Hussain Ahmed (born 1951), Pakistani politician and Islamic scholar from Balochistan
Kobad Hussain Ahmed, Indian politician from Assam in the 1950s and 1960s
 Hussain Rasheed Ahmed (born 1957), Maldivian Sunni Islamic scholar and political leader